Șerban Țițeica ( – May 28, 1985) was a Romanian quantum physicist. He is regarded as the founder of the Romanian school of theoretical physics.

The third and last child of mathematician Gheorghe Țițeica, he was born in Bucharest, where he attended Mihai Viteazul National College. He then went to the University of Bucharest, graduating in 1929 with a degree in Physics and Chemistry and another in Mathematics. He studied at Leipzig University from 1930 to 1934 under Werner Heisenberg, earning a doctorate in 1935, with thesis "On the behaviour of electrical resistance of metals in magnetic field". 

Țițeica taught at Politehnica University of Bucharest from 1935 to 1941 as assistant professor, and was then a professor at the University of Iași (1941–1948) and the University of Bucharest (1949–1977). He became a titular member of the Romanian Academy in 1955, and served as its vice president from 1963 until his death in his native city.

Țițeica was a member of the Academy of Sciences of the USSR and of the Saxon Academy of Sciences and Humanities in Leipzig. He was also the Vice-Director of the Joint Institute for Nuclear Research in Dubna (1962–1964), and a member of the Council of the European Physical Society (1970–1975). 

He is buried at Bellu Cemetery, in Bucharest.

References 

1908 births
1985 deaths
Scientists from Bucharest
Romanian physicists
University of Bucharest alumni
Leipzig University alumni
Academic staff of the Politehnica University of Bucharest
Academic staff of Alexandru Ioan Cuza University
Academic staff of the University of Bucharest
Titular members of the Romanian Academy
Burials at Bellu Cemetery